Die in Cries (stylized as DIE IN CRIES) was a Japanese visual kei rock band of the 1990s, whose members have all played in other prominent bands.

History
Formed in 1991, Die in Cries was composed of Kyo (D'erlanger) on vocals, Shin (ex:Mad Capsule Markets) on guitar, Takashi (ex:The Ace) on bass, and Yukihiro (ex:Zi:Kill) on drums. Yukihiro and Shin previously played together in Optic Nerve. While they were one of the more popular visual kei bands in the 90's, international visual kei fans haven't shown the same interest as contemporaries rock bands.

Following their breakup in 1995 the members all went on to play in other bands. The most prominent and well known of these is most likely Yukihiro who was recruited to play for the popular band L'Arc-en-Ciel. Kyo, Shin and Takashi all went on to form Bug, with Shin later leaving to play for Spin and Creature Creature, solo project of Morrie of Dead End, which originally featured Tetsuya of L'Arc-en-Ciel and currently features Sakura, whom Yukihiro replaced when he joined L'Arc-en-Ciel.

Members
Vocals: Hiroshi "Kyo" Isono (ex:Saver Tiger, D'erlanger,→Solo, Bug, D'erlanger)
Guitar: Shin Murohime (ex:The Mad Capsule Markets, Optic Nerve,→Bloody Imitation Society, Bug, Spin, Creature Creature)
Bass: Takashi Kaneuchi (ex:The Ace,→Fame, Hybrid, Bug)
Drums: Yukihiro (ex:Guerrilla, Zi:Kill, Optic Nerve,→L'Arc-en-Ciel, Acid Android)

Discography

Albums
Nothingness to Revolution - 1991.08.01
Visage - 1992.03.11 Oricon Album Chart Position: No. 5
Node - 1992.09.23 No. 14
Eros - 1993.07.07 No. 7
 - 1993.12.01 No. 17
Seeds - 1995.06.21 No. 20
Last Live「1995.7.2」 - 1995.09.21 No. 16
Re-make - 1995.10.21 No. 70
Thanx: Best of Die in Cries - 1997.06.21

Singles
"Melodies" - 1992.02.05 Oricon Single Chart Position: No. 24
 - 1992.09.23 No. 29
"to you" - 1993.01.08 No. 35
"Nocturne" - 1993.06.02 No. 34
"Love Song" - 1993.11.21 No. 56
"Crescent Moon" - 1994.05.21 No. 42
 - 1995.05.24 No. 46

References

Visual kei musical groups
Japanese alternative rock groups
Musical groups established in 1991
Musical groups disestablished in 1995
Musical quartets
Musical groups from Kanagawa Prefecture
1991 establishments in Japan